Founded in 1956,The Awty International School is a private school located in Spring Branch, western Houston, Texas, United States. Awty allows its students to receive the International Baccalaureate or the French Baccalauréat, and is the only school in Houston fully accredited by the French Ministry of Education, making it the only overseas school for French national students in the Houston area. It has age three to 12th grade students. Awty is the largest international school in the United States and the largest private day school in Houston. It is part of the Agency for French Education Abroad (AEFE) network of schools for French national students abroad.

History
Awty opened at 3736 Westheimer Road on September 10, 1956. Originally a pre-school, it was founded by Kathleen "Kay" Awty. The school initially had 27 students at the kindergarten and prekindergarten levels.

The school moved to 1615 Garretson Street in 1960. By 1970, It served grades preschool through sixth. By that same year there were 250 students enrolled. The upper school division opened in 1975, and in 1976 four female students graduated from the high school, forming the first graduating class. In 1979, Awty merged with the French School of Houston and began offering a bilingual program. That year, the school moved to its current campus.

In 1984 the school received its current name, the Awty International School. A preschool facility opened in 1990. Kay Awty died in 1996.

On the school's 50th anniversary in 2006, a $5 million athletic complex including a 1,400-seat stadium, 85 parking spaces, and tennis courts were constructed.

Affiliations and accreditation
Awty is affiliated with the Mission Laïque Française. Agencies accrediting Awty include the International Baccalaureate (IB), the Independent Schools Association of the Southwest (ISAS), the Ministry of National Education of France, and the Ministry of Education, Culture and Science of the Netherlands.

Awty is also affiliated with Agence pour l'enseignement français à l'étranger (AEFE), the Council of International Schools (CIS), the National Association of Independent Schools (NAIS), the Association for the Advancement of International Education (AAIE), the Southwest Preparatory Conference (SPC), Houston Junior Preparatory Conference (HJPC), Houston Area Independent Schools (HAIS), and Texas International Baccalaureate Schools (TIBS).

Curriculum
The school offers the IB Diploma, the French Baccalauréat diploma, and a general high school diploma. As of 2021, Awty is the only school in Greater Houston offering both tracks to the International Baccalaureate and French Baccalauréat diplomas, and the only school in Texas requiring all seniors to take the final exams in one of these two programs. The AEFE accredits Awty.

Preparing students for the global lives they are sure to lead, all students are immersed in the study of a second language.  The form of immersion varies depending on the grade level.  Students in PK3 through Kindergarten are immersed in either English/French or English/Spanish.  In 1st grade through 5th grade, language immersion is with core subjects taught in the primary language of either English, French, or Spanish and specials such as art, gym, and library are taught in the second language, as well as the daily hour-long second language class. Students in 6th grade through 12th grade attend a daily intensive second language class, and have extensive third language options.  Languages in addition to English, French, and Spanish often include Arabic, German, Hindi, Japanese, Korean, Mandarin, and Russian.  On any given year, Awty typically offers ten different language options.

Campus
It is in proximity to the intersection of the 610 Loop and Interstate 10, and is northwest of it. The campus buildings together have 120 classrooms.

A three-story, 33-classroom facility, called the Levant Foundation Building, is located near the school's entrance. Opened in 2012, the building includes administrative offices, a dining hall, two art rooms, and a digital photography room. This facility replaced the preceding temporary buildings. The Levant Foundation Building and a five-story parking garage were the first phase of a four-phase, $50 million building program of facilities designed by Bailey Architects. The second phase of the project was completed in 2014 with the opening of an elementary building, which includes a computer lab, a media room, an infirmary, two art rooms, and a teacher's lounge and workroom.

Awty historically relied on the use of temporary buildings, and elementary school classes were originally located in the school's original building, "Big Blue." Demolition of "Big Blue" was completed in August, 2014 to make way for the new Student Campus Center.

In 2017, a second 5-acre Early Learning Campus was added nearby for students in PK3/PS, PK4/MS, Kinder/GS, and 1st grade/CP featuring 26 classrooms, dedicated indoor spaces for art, music, dining, after-school program, and technology, as well as a full gym. Outdoors, the facility features two playgrounds, learning gardens, and three decks for class activities.

The former campus on Garrettson Street was west of the 610 Loop, in what is now the Uptown Houston district. It was in proximity to River Oaks and Tanglewood.

Student body

As of 2021, the school's enrollment was over 1,717 students. This makes it the largest international school in the United States and the largest private school in Houston. As of that year the students originated from the United States, France, and 48 other countries.  54% are U.S. citizens, 12% are U.S. citizens with multiple citizenship, and 34% are from one or more of 50 other countries. Over 60% are bilingual.

Transportation
 the school provides bus services for students to and from the Dairy Ashford area, Greater Katy, the Lakes on Eldridge/Lakes on Eldridge North/Twin Lakes area, Memorial, Shadowbriar, Sugar Land, and the Town and Country Mall area in Spring Branch.

Athletics
In 2019-2020, The Awty International School joined the Southwest Preparatory Conference (SPC) and Houston Junior Preparatory Conference (HJPC).

The athletic campus, Awty Field, is located at 1255 North Post Oak, adjacent to the main campus. Its opening ceremony was held on April 22, 2008. The athletic compound includes a stadium with 1,400 seats, four tennis courts, a press box, a polyethylene soccer pitch, 80 parking spaces, locker rooms, a storage facility, offices of coaches, and a concessions stand. In addition it has a running track that circles around the other facilities. It has wide turns and a Beynon 1000 urethane surface. Stuart Holden, a midfielder for the Houston Dynamo and an alumnus of the school, attended the 2008 opening ceremony.

Prior to the opening of the athletic compound, each athletic team practiced off campus. Home tennis matched were played at the tennis courts of other schools in the 5A district of the Texas Association of Private and Parochial Schools. Practice for the tennis team was held at the Memorial Park Tennis Center at Memorial Park. The track team historically practiced at several stadiums of TAPPS 5A schools; in 2008 the team was practicing at the St. John's School. The soccer teams played only "away" games (games held at other schools or stadiums) before the opening of the new compound, and practiced on a soccer field on the Awty premises. Annette Baird of the Houston Chronicle describes the former soccer field as "an undersized bumpy pitch".

Currently, students competing in swimming at Awty practice at Dad's Club.

Awty Athletics Team Championships

Notable alumni
  (Class of 2010) - sports anchor for SportsCenter (ESPNDeportes) in Mexico City
 Ted Cruz (attended middle school) - United States Senator
Stuart Holden (Class of 2003) - midfielder for the Houston Dynamo and Bolton Wanderers
 Clint Smith (Class of 2006) - writer, poet, and activist

Notable faculty
 J. Fred Duckett - coach and history teacher
 Ryan Harlan - NCAA National Champion in the Decathlon

See also
 British School of Houston
 St. John's School 
 The Kinkaid School
 Memorial High School

References

Further reading 
 Cain, Josh (Associate Editor). "Meet the new headmaster of Houston's largest K-12 private school." Houston Business Journal. April 18, 2014.
 "Texas." Engineering News-Record (ENR), ISSN 0891-9526, 03/1998, Volume 240, Issue 13, p. 51 "[...]A new performing arts and athletic center for The Awty International School is being built by Brookstone Corp. Located at 7455 Awty School Lane in Houston[...]"
 Houston Business Journal's Diversity in Business Awards, March 2021
 Samuels, Matt (Multimedia Manager) "Awty students place stones at Jewish cemetery" Jewish Herald-Voice ( see index). March 25, 2021

External links

 Awty International School official site
 Architectural information on the renovation of Awty's lower school

Private K-12 schools in Houston
Independent Schools Association of the Southwest
Preparatory schools in Texas
French international schools in the United States
International schools in Texas
European-American culture in Houston
French-American culture in Texas
Educational institutions established in 1956
Spring Branch, Houston
Bilingual schools in Houston
1956 establishments in Texas